Sean Wirtz (also Sean Kelly and Sean Kelly-Wirtz; born October 31, 1979, in Marathon, Ontario) is a Canadian figure skater who competed in pair skating and single skating. He teamed up with Elizabeth Putnam in the summer of 2002. They are the 2006 Four Continents bronze medalists and two-time (2003, 2004) Canadian national bronze medalists. Wirtz announced his retirement from competitive skating on August 28, 2007.

Wirtz is the nephew of coach Paul Wirtz and former Olympic pair skater Kris Wirtz.

Programs 
(with Putnam)

Results

Pairs skating with Putnam

Pair skating with Dubois

Singles career

References

External links

 
 

1979 births
Canadian male single skaters
Canadian male pair skaters
Living people
People from Thunder Bay District
Four Continents Figure Skating Championships medalists
20th-century Canadian people
21st-century Canadian people